Freiberger Brauhaus is a brewery in Freiberg, and the oldest brewery in Saxony, Germany. The first written record of its existence is a document from 1266 in which Margrave Heinrich gave Freiberg the sole right to supply beer for the Saxon mining region.

2006 the company was sold to German company Radeberger Group, which is part of German company Dr. Oetker.

Products 
The recent brewery products include:
Freiberger Edelkeller Longneck 
Freiberger Alkoholfrei Longneck 
Freibergisch 1863 Jubiläums-Pils Longneck 
Freibergisch Bockbier Longneck 
Freibergisch Schankbier Longneck 
Freibergisch Exportbier Longneck 
Freibergisch Festbier Longneck 
Freibergisch Radler Longneck 
Freibergisch Schwarzbier Longneck 
Meisterbräu Pilsner NRW 
Meisterbräu Export NRW 
Meisterbräu Cola-Bier NRW 
Meisterbräu Zitrone (Radler) NRW

See also 

List of oldest companies

References

External links 
Homepage in German
Facebook page

Breweries in Germany
Beer brands of Germany
13th-century establishments in the Holy Roman Empire
Freiberg
Dr. Oetker